William Whiteley may refer to:

 William Whiteley (1831–1907), British entrepreneur, founder of Whiteleys department store in London
 William G. Whiteley (1819–1886), United States Representative from Delaware
 William Whiteley (politician) (1881–1955), British Labour Member of Parliament for Blaydon in County Durham
 William Henry Whiteley (1834–1903), Newfoundland politician
Bill Whiteley, fictional character in British soap opera, Emmerdale